The Set Decorators Society of America Awards 2020 honored the best set decorators in film and television in 2020. The inaugural SDSA Film Awards were held on March 31, 2021, and nominations were announced March 11, 2021.

The nominations for the television categories were announced on June 17, 2021, while the winners were announced on July 20, 2021.

Winners and nominees

Film

Television

References

External links
 

2020 film awards
2020 television awards
2020 in American cinema